Thelma Percy (October 20, 1903 - July 6, 1970) was a British actress. She was born in Belfast, Northern Ireland. Fellow actress Eileen Percy was her sister. She appeared on stage in the 1922 show The Blushing Bride. Percy died in Santa Monica, California.

Filmography
The Vanishing Dagger (1920) as Elizabeth Latimer
The Beggar Prince (1920) as Sosad 
Wolf Tracks (1920) 
The Stage Hand (1920) as The Animal Trainer
The Star Rover (1920) as Faith Levering
Seven Years Bad Luck (1921) as Station Agent's Daughter
High and Dry (1921)

References

Silent film actresses from Northern Ireland
1903 births
1970 deaths